Konstantinos (Kostis) Hatzidakis (born 20 April 1965 in Rethymno) is a Greek politician of New Democracy who has been serving as the Minister for Labor and Social Affairs in the Cabinet of Kyriakos Mitsotakis since 2021. Among other offices, he previously held the post of Minister for the Environment and Energy. Within his party, he serves as vice president under Mitsotakis' leadership.

Political career
Hatzidakis was elected President of the Youth Organisation of New Democracy (ONNED), serving from 1992 to 1994.

Member of the European Parliament, 1994–2007
Hatzidakis was elected as a Member of the European Parliament (MEP) for New Democracy in the European elections of 1994, 1999 and 2004. During his time in parliament from 1994 until 2007, he served on the Committee on Regional Development. From 2004 until 2005. He was also a member of the Temporary committee on policy challenges and budgetary means of the enlarged Union 2007-2013. In addition to his committee assignments, he was part of the parliament's delegations to the EU-Cyprus Joint Parliamentary Committee (1994–1999); to the parliamentary cooperation committees for relations with Armenia, Azerbaijan and Georgia (1999–2004); and to the EU-Turkey Joint Parliamentary Committee.

Career in national politics
In the 2007 Greek legislative election, Hatzidakis was elected to the Hellenic Parliament for the Athens B constituency and consequently resigned from the European Parliament.

Hatzidakis served as Minister for Transport and Communications from 2007 to 2009 and then as Minister for Development in 2009.

On 15 December 2010, Hatzidakis was ambushed and assaulted by violent rioters during a general strike at the height of the Greek government-debt crisis.

Minister for the Environment and Energy, 2019–2021
In his capacity as energy minister, Hatzidakis was tasked to work on a rescue plan for state-owned Public Power Corporation (PPC) which had been struggling with 2.7 billion euros ($2.99 billion) of unpaid bills from customers unable to pay during the country’s financial crisis. From 2020, he also oversaw efforts to liquidate majority state-owned nickel producer LARCO, another company struggling under heavy debt, and then look for an investor for some of the company’s assets. Under his leadership, Greece also began the sale of a minority stake in PPC-owned power distribution operator HEDNO and of power grid operator ADMIE in 2020.

Minister for Labor and Social Affairs, 2021–present
In May 2021, Hatzidakis introduced the government's plans to overhaul Greek labour laws by liberalizing working hours, including by introducing a "digital work card" to monitor employees working hours in real time as well as increasing legal overtime to 150 hours a year.

References

External links
  
 
 

|-

|-

|-

|-

|-

|-

1965 births
Living people
Government ministers of Greece
Environment ministers of Greece
Labour ministers of Greece
Ministers of Transport and Communications of Greece
Greek MPs 2007–2009
Greek MPs 2009–2012
Greek MPs 2012 (May)
Greek MPs 2012–2014
Greek MPs 2015 (February–August)
Greek MPs 2015–2019
Greek MPs 2019–2023
MEPs for Greece 1994–1999
MEPs for Greece 1999–2004
MEPs for Greece 2004–2009
New Democracy (Greece) MEPs
New Democracy (Greece) politicians
Politicians from Crete
Alumni of the University of Kent
People from Rethymno